Gitali Roy was a Bengali film actress. She acted in four of Satyajit Ray's film Mahapurush, Chiriakhana, Mahanagar and Charulata. Among other notable films she also acted in Baksa Badal, a story by Bibhutibhushan Bandyopadhyay and directed by Nityananda Datta in 1970.

Filmography

References

External links 
 

Bengali film people
Actresses in Bengali cinema